Jacques de Bourgogne, seigneur de Fallais (b. c.1515), was a Flemish nobleman and initially supporter of Calvin. He is known for his letter L'Excuse de Noble Seigneur Jacques de Bourgogne, Seigneur de Falais Et de Bredam.

References

1510s births
Flemish writers (before 1830)
Flemish nobility
Year of death missing